Democratic Bloc of Diambour (in French: Bloc Démocratique du Diambour) was a political party in Diambour, Senegal. BDD merged into the Senegalese Party of Socialist Action.

Source: Nzouankeu, Jacques Mariel. Les partis politiques sénégalais. Dakar: Editions Clairafrique, 1984.

Political parties in Senegal